The Internacional San Miguel de Allende, commonly known as Inter San Miguel, was a Mexican football club based in San Miguel de Allende. The club was founded in 2017, and played in the Serie B of Liga Premier. In 2018, the team was relocated in San Luis Potosí and was renamed as FC Potosino, Inter San Miguel was dissolved.

Players

Current squad

References 

Association football clubs established in 2017
Football clubs in Guanajuato
2017 establishments in Mexico
Liga Premier de México